The 2022 Asian U18 Athletics Championships was the fourth edition of the biennial, continental athletics competition for Asian athletes aged 15 to 17. It was held at the Ahmed Al Rashdan Track & Field Stadium in Kuwait City from 13 to 16 October 2022.

History of Asian Youth Athletics Championship 
The Asian Youth Athletics Championships (U18) (Asian Youth U18 Athletics Championships) is a biennial, continental athletics competition for Asian athletes, organised by the Asian Athletics Association. First held in 2015, it is a youth category event open to athletes aged fifteen and seventeen. The competition was the fourth continental athletics competition to be held for that age level, following in the steps of the South American, Oceanian and African events. Its first edition came at a time of rising interest in such competitions, with the first African championships being held in 2013, and the European Athletics Youth Championships scheduled for the following year. In March 2014, the Asian Athletics Association's president Dahlan Jumaan al-Hamad cited the creation of the championships as a way of boosting the grassroots-level development of the sport in Asia and raising the importance of continental-level competition among the region's countries.

Medal summary

Men

Women

Nations

Kuwait was hosting around 400 athletes from 33 Asian Countries. Athletes competed in 40 athletics sports, 20 for boys and 20 for girls.

 
 
 
 
 
 
 
 
 
 
  (25)
 
 
 
 
 
  (35)
 
 
 
 
 
 
 
 
 
 
 
 
 
 
 
  (11)

Medal table
Following a decision by the judges, the bronze medal was awarded to two athletes in 800m Girls.

References

External links
 Results
 Asian Athletics Association website

Asian Youth Athletics Championships
Asian Youth Athletics Championships
Asian Athletics Championships